The Niagara Parks Commission, commonly shortened to Niagara Parks, is an agency of the Government of Ontario which maintains the Ontario shoreline of the Niagara River.

History 
The Commission was founded in 1885 and charged with preserving and enhancing the natural beauty of Niagara Falls and the Niagara River corridor as a public greenspace and environmental heritage. The first commissioner was Casimir Gzowski. Other notable Commissioners have included Thomas McQuesten and James Allan. Current Commission Chair is vice chair April Jeff’s. Former chair Sandie Bellows, died October 2021.

Activity 
In this corridor, the NPC manages numerous trails, historic sites, picnic areas, and attractions. The Commission formerly managed Navy Island National Historic Site under a lease agreement with the Parks Canada.

Niagara Parks also operated the People Mover, a shuttle bus system intended to aid transportation along the Niagara River and help reduce automobile crowding near the Falls. The buses were powered by propane and included a trailer unit during most popular hours. In the long term, the Commission is planning for a fixed track transit system along the Niagara Parkway, although no decision has been taken on the exact technology to be used. In the meantime, the Commission joined forces with Niagara Falls Transit to launch the fully accessible WEGO bus system in 2012, and in the process discontinued the People Mover service.

Sites and attractions managed by the Commission
 Chippawa Battlefield Park: site of the Battle of Chippawa in the War of 1812 and a National Historic Site
 Dufferin Islands
 Falls Incline Railway: funicular railway connecting Table Rock Welcome Centre to the hotels in the Fallsview Tourist Area
 Hornblower Niagara Cruises: boat trips along the Niagara River to the Bridal Veil and Horseshoe Falls (formerly operated by Maid of the Mist), operated under contract by Hornblower Cruises 
 Laura Secord Homestead: historic home of Laura Secord, a heroine of the War of 1812, and a National Historic Site on the Laura Secord Legacy Trail
 Mackenzie Printery: printing museum located in the home of historic politician and journalist William Lyon Mackenzie, leader of the Upper Canada Rebellion
 McFarland House
 Niagara Glen Nature Reserve
 Niagara Parks School of Horticulture: a world-renowned training centre for horticulturalists and gardeners
 Niagara Parks Botanical Gardens
 Niagara Parks Butterfly Conservatory
 Oak Hall: historic home of mining tycoon Harry Oakes, now used for NPC offices
 Old Fort Erie: historic British fort and a National Historic Site
 Queen Victoria Park
 Queenston Floral Clock
 Table Rock Welcome Centre: visitor's centre in Niagara Falls with observation decks, restaurants, and shopping areas
 Journey Behind the Falls: tourist attraction consisting of tunnels and observation platforms adjacent to and behind the Horseshoe Falls
 Whirlpool Aero Car: a scenic cable car ride which crosses over the Niagara Whirlpool
 Niagara Parks Power Station: a decommissioned power station on the Canadian side of the Niagara River. The restored facility includes immersive exhibits, restored artifacts and interactive storytelling
 Floral Showhouse: a greenhouse featuring several floral shows each year, celebrating major holidays, community events and the beauty of nature
 White Water Walk: a quarter-mile boardwalk located along the shoreline of the Lower Niagara River providing a close view of the class six rapids

Niagara Heritage Trail
The Niagara Heritage Trail is a historic and scenic route running the entire 56 kilometre Canadian coastline of the Niagara River from Fort Erie northward to Niagara-on-the-Lake. Construction began in stages during the early 1980s, and was completed in 1995.

The trail makes its central heart in Queen Victoria Park near the main tourist area, and also passes by attractions such as the Whirlpool Golf Course, Niagara Botanical Gardens, the Butterfly Conservatory, and the Floral clock.

See also
 List of botanical gardens in Canada
 Alfred H. Savage – Sarnia born horticulturalist and transit manager, School of Horticulture graduate 1952
 William "Red" Hill Sr., life saving hero; in 2018, the Commission installed a commemorative display of his heroic work in 1918 during the Niagara Scow incident

References

Further reading

External links
Niagara Parks
Niagara Parks Act
The Niagara Parks Commission Collection of Images in the Historic Niagara Digital Collection
The Niagara Parks School of Horticulture

 
Ontario government departments and agencies
Protected areas of the Regional Municipality of Niagara
Government agencies established in 1885
Environmental organizations established in 1885
1885 establishments in Ontario